Balázs Gulyás (born 26 June 1956) is a Hungarian neurobiologist.

Personalia
Gulyás is a Hungarian born neurobiologist now working and residing in Singapore. Since 1988, Gulyás has been living in Stockholm, working at the Karolinska Institute. Since 2013, while keeping his professorship at the Karolinska Institutet in Stockholm, he has been one of the founding professors of the Imperial College London-Nanyang Technological University Lee Kong Chian School of Medicine in Singapore where he is responsible for Translational Neuroscience and is the Scientific Director of Neuroscience and Mental Health . At NTU he is the founding director of the university's Centre for Neuroimaging Research at NTU (CeNReN). He has also a visiting professorship at the Division of Brain Sciences, Department of Medicine, Imperial College London. Gulyás received his university degrees from Semmelweis University from which he graduated as Doctor of Medicine (MD) and from the Catholic University of Leuven where he obtained a BA (1982) and an MA (1984) in Philosophy (Higher Institute of Philosophy) and a PhD in neurobiology (1988, Faculty of Medicine). He has also pursued studies in physics at Budapest's Eotvos Lorand University (1976-1981) and in canon law and law at the Catholic University of Leuven (1984-1988).

Work
Gulyás' main research interest is in basic neuroscience, neurology, psychiatry, functional neuroimaging and cognitive neuroscience. In recent years, he has also been involved in neuropharmacological drug and biomarker research and development.

Gulyás has published ten books, over 35 book-chapters and over 200 research papers in peer reviewed scientific journals.

A professor of neuroscience at the Karolinska Institute, Stockholm, Sweden, Gulyás was a guest professor, among others, of the Collège de France, and is a faculty member of the Parmenides Foundation . He is a member of the Hungarian Academy of Sciences (since 1995), the Academia Europaea (where he is also a member of the Council and the Board of Trustees) and the Royal Belgian Academy of Medicine. He is the founder of the World Science Forum series.

Publications
His books include:

 Gulyás, B. (ed.) The Brain-Mind Problem. Philosophical and Neurophysiological Approaches. Leuven and Assen: Leuven University Press and Van Gorcum, 1987. p. XI+119. 
 Gulyás, B., Ottoson, D., and Roland, P. E. (eds.) Functional Organization of the Human Visual Cortex. Oxford: Pergamon Press, 1993. p. 391. . 
 Gulyás, B. and Müller-Gärtner, H. W. (eds.) Positron emission tomography: A critical assessment of recent trends. Dordrecht: Kluwer Academic Publisher, 1998. p. 482.  
 Pléh, C., Kovács, G. and Gulyás, B. (eds.) Cognitive Neuroscience. Budapest, Osiris Press, 2003. 832 p. .  
 Kraft, E., Gulyás, B. and Pöppel, E. (eds.) Neural Correlates of Thinking.  Springer Verlag, 2008.   , 
 Vasbinder, J.W. and Gulyás, B. Cultural Patterns and Neurocognitive Circuits. World Scientific, 2016. Pp. 212.

References

External links
 Balazs Gulyás's LKCMedicine website
 Balazs Gulyas on the website of HAS.

1956 births
Living people
Members of the Hungarian Academy of Sciences
Hungarian neuroscientists
People educated at the Benedictine High School of Pannonhalma
Catholic University of Leuven alumni